Miss Heritage Global  formerly known as Miss Heritage World is an international beauty pageant, that stands for advancing World Heritage. The pageant was founded in Zimbabwean Country Branding Expert  by Tare Munzara. The 6th Miss Heritage Global will be crowned at Kalahari Resort in the Province of Limpopo  on the 24th of September 2022

History
Miss Heritage Global Pageant was authored and Created by  Tare Munzara  who then convinced  business partner  Co Founder Ronald Tisauke who agreed and worked on the technical side of the pageant event. Tare Munzara conceptualized the concept and vision of the pageant  in 2012 during a visit at a World Heritage Site in Zimbabwe (The Victoria Falls) in a hotel room Elephant Hills Hotel. He further  developed  the concept over time  in his Bedroom which he used as his working space. Miss Heritage pageant was founded on the basis to incorporate all nations, all religions and all people from different backgrounds to be involved in the process of initiating positive change the world through the use of world heritage. Its name was rebranded twice, from Miss Heritage World to Miss Heritage, and then to Miss Heritage Global, of which the first instance was due to legal issues by Julia Morley of Miss World, and then the second time it was when Tare Munzara who was President at that time, left the pageant.

Titleholders

Runners-up

Continental Queens of Beauty

See also

References

Further reading

 
Beauty pageants in South Africa
Recurring events established in 2012
International beauty pageants